EEG analysis is exploiting mathematical signal analysis methods and computer technology to extract information from electroencephalography (EEG) signals. The targets of EEG analysis are to help researchers gain a better understanding of the brain; assist physicians in diagnosis and treatment choices; and to boost brain-computer interface (BCI) technology. There are many ways to roughly categorize EEG analysis methods. If a mathematical model is exploited to fit the sampled EEG signals, the method can be categorized as parametric, otherwise, it is a non-parametric method. Traditionally, most EEG analysis methods fall into four categories: time domain, frequency domain, time-frequency domain, and nonlinear methods. There are also later methods including deep neural networks (DNNs).

Methods

Frequency domain methods 
Frequency domain analysis, also known as spectral analysis, is the most conventional yet one of the most powerful and standard methods for EEG analysis. It gives insight into information contained in the frequency domain of EEG waveforms by adopting statistical and Fourier Transform methods. Among all the spectral methods, power spectral analysis is the most commonly used, since the power spectrum reflects the 'frequency content' of the signal or the distribution of signal power over frequency.

Time domain methods 
There are two important methods for time domain EEG analysis: Linear Prediction and Component Analysis. Generally, Linear Prediction gives the estimated value equal to a linear combination of the past output value with the present and past input value. And Component Analysis is an unsupervised method in which the data set is mapped to a feature set. Notably, the parameters in time domain methods are entirely based on time, but they can also be extracted from statistical moments of the power spectrum. As a result, time domain method builds a bridge between physical time interpretation and conventional spectral analysis. Besides, time domain methods offer a way to on-line measurement of basic signal properties by means of a time-based calculation, which requires less complex equipment compared to conventional frequency analysis.

Time-frequency domain methods 
Wavelet Transform, a typical time-frequency domain method, can extract and represent properties from transient biological signals. Specifically, through wavelet decomposition of the EEG records, transient features can be accurately captured and localized in both time and frequency context. Thus Wavelet transform is like a mathematical microscope that can analyze different scales of neural rhythms and investigate small-scale oscillations of the brain signals while ignoring the contribution of other scales. Apart from Wavelet Transform, there is another prominent time-frequency method called Hilbert-Huang Transform, which can decompose EEG signals into a set of oscillatory components called Intrinsic Mode Function (IMF) in order to capture instantaneous frequency data.

Nonlinear methods 
Many phenomena in nature are nonlinear and  non-stationary, and so are EEG signals. This attribute adds more complexity to the interpretation of EEG signals, rendering linear methods (methods mentioned above) limited.  Since 1985 when two pioneers in nonlinear EEG analysis, Rapp and Bobloyantz, published their first results, the theory of nonlinear dynamic systems, also called 'chaos theory', has been broadly applied to the field of EEG analysis. To conduct nonlinear EEG analysis, researchers have adopted many useful nonlinear parameters such as Lyapunov Exponent, Correlation Dimension, and entropies like Approximate Entropy and Sample Entropy.

ANN methods 
The implementation of Artificial Neural Networks (ANN) is presented for classification of electroencephalogram (EEG) signals. In most cases, EEG data involves a preprocess of wavelet transform before putting into the neural networks. RNN (recurrent neural networks) was once considerably applied in studies of ANN implementations in EEG analysis. Until the boom of deep learning and CNN (Convolutional Neural Networks), CNN method becomes a new favorite in recent studies of EEG analysis employing deep learning. With cropped training for the deep CNN to reach competitive accuracies on the dataset, deep CNN has presented a superior decoding performance. Moreover, the big EEG data, as the input of ANN, calls for the need for safe storage and high computational resources for real-time processing. To address these challenges, a cloud-based deep learning has been proposed and presented for real-time analysis of big EEG data.

Applications

Clinical 
EEG analysis is widely used in brain-disease diagnosis and assessment. In the domain of epileptic seizures, the detection of epileptiform discharges in the EEG is an important component in the diagnosis of epilepsy. Careful analyses of the EEG records can provide valuable insight and improved understanding of the mechanisms causing epileptic disorders. Besides, EEG analysis also helps much with the detection of Alzheimer's disease, tremor, etc.

BCI (Brain-computer Interface) 

EEG recordings during right and left motor imagery allow one to establish a new communication channel. Based on real-time EEG analysis with subject-specific spatial patterns, a brain–computer interface (BCI) can be used to develop a simple binary response for the control of a device. Such an EEG-based BCI can help, e.g., patients with amyotrophic lateral sclerosis, with some daily activities.

Analysis tool 
Brainstorm is a collaborative, open-source application dedicated to the analysis of brain recordings including MEG, EEG, fNIRS, ECoG, depth electrodes and animal invasive neurophysiology. The objective of Brainstorm is to share a comprehensive set of user-friendly tools with the scientific community using MEG/EEG as an experimental technique. Brainstorm offers rich and intuitive graphic interface for physicians and researchers, which does not require any programming knowledge. Some other relative open source analysis software include FieldTrip, etc.

Others 
Combined with facial expressions analysis, EEG analysis offers the function of continuous emotion detection, which can be used to find the emotional traces of videos. Some other applications include EEG-based brain mapping, personalized EEG-based encryptor, EEG-Based image annotation system, etc.

See also

References

External links 

Electroencephalography
Neurotechnology
Signal processing
Mathematics in medicine